Andrew Painter may refer to:

Andrew Painter (baseball) (born 2003), American baseball pitcher
Andrew Painter (tennis) (born 1975), Australian tennis player